The Men's downhill competition at the FIS Alpine World Ski Championships 1931 was held on 20 February.

Results

References

Men's downhill